k-anonymity is a property possessed by certain anonymized data. The term  k-anonymity was first introduced by  Pierangela Samarati and Latanya Sweeney in a paper published in 1998, although the concept dates to a 1986 paper by Tore Dalenius.

K-anonyminity is an attempt to solve the problem: "Given person-specific field-structured data, produce a release of the data with scientific guarantees that the individuals who are the subjects of the data cannot be re-identified while the data remain practically useful." A release of data is said to have the k-anonymity property if the information for each person contained in the release cannot be distinguished from at least  individuals whose information also appear in the release. Unfortunately, the guarantees provided by k-anonymity are aspirational, not mathematical.

Methods for k-anonymization
To use k-anonymity to process a dataset so that it can be released with privacy protection, a data scientist must first examine the dataset and decide if each attribute (column) is an identifier (identifying), a non-identifier (not-identifying), or a quasi-identifier (somewhat identifying).  Identifiers such as names are suppressed, non-identifying values are allowed to remain, and the quasi-identifiers need to be processed so that every distinct combination of quasi-identifiers designates at least k records.

In the example table below presents a fictional nonanonymized database consisting of the patient records for a fictitious hospital.  The Name column is an identifier, Age, Gender, State of domicile, and Religion are quasi-identifiers, and Disease is a non-identifying sensitive value. But what about Height and Weight? Are they also non-identifying sensitive values, or are they quasi-identifiers?

 Patients treated in the study on April 30

There are 6 attributes and 10 records in this data. There are two common methods for achieving k-anonymity for some value of k.

Suppression: In this method, certain values of the attributes are replaced by an asterisk '*'. All or some values of a column may be replaced by '*'. In the anonymized table below, we have replaced all the values in the 'Name' attribute and all the values in the 'Religion' attribute with a '*'.
Generalization: In this method, individual values of attributes are replaced with a broader category. For example, the value '19' of the attribute 'Age' may be replaced by ' ≤ 20', the value '23' by '20 < Age ≤ 30' , etc.

The next table shows the anonymized database.

 Patients treated in the study on April 30

This data has 2-anonymity with respect to the attributes 'Age', 'Gender' and 'State of domicile' since for any combination of these attributes found in any row of the table there are always at least 2 rows with those exact attributes. The attributes available to an adversary are called quasi-identifiers. Each quasi-identifier tuple occurs in at least k records for a dataset with k-anonymity.

Critiques of k-anonyminity 
This examples demonstrates a failing with k-anonymity: there may exist other data records that can be linked on the variables that are allegedly non-identifying. For example, if an attacker is able to obtain the a log from the person who was taking vital signs as part of the study and learns that Kishor was at the hospital on April 30 and is 180cm tall, this information can be used to link with the "anonymized" database (which may have been published on the Internet) and learn that Kishor has a heart-related disease. An attacker who knows that Kishor visited the hospital on April 30 may be able to infer this simply knowing that Kishor is 180cm hight, roughly 80-82 kg, and comes from Karnataka.

The root of this problem is the core problem with k-anonyminity: there is no way to mathematically, unambiguously determine if an attribute is an identifier, a quasi-identifier, or a non-identifying sensitive value. In fact, all values are potentially identifying, depending on their prevalence in the population and on auxiliary data that the attacker may have. Other privacy mechanisms such as differential privacy do not share this problem. 

Meyerson and Williams (2004) demonstrated that optimal k-anonymity is an NP-hard problem, however heuristic methods such as k-Optimize as given by Bayardo and Agrawal (2005) often yield effective results.

Possible attacks 
While k-anonymity is a promising approach to take for group based anonymization given its simplicity and wide array of algorithms that perform it, it is however susceptible to many attacks. When background knowledge is available to an attacker, such attacks become even more effective. Such attacks include:

 Homogeneity Attack: This attack leverages the case where all the values for a sensitive value within a set of k records are identical. In such cases, even though the data has been k-anonymized, the sensitive value for the set of k records may be exactly predicted.
 Background Knowledge Attack: This attack leverages an association between one or more quasi-identifier attributes with the sensitive attribute to reduce the set of possible values for the sensitive attribute. For example, Machanavajjhala, Kifer, Gehrke, and Venkitasubramaniam (2007) showed that knowing that heart attacks occur at a reduced rate in Japanese patients could be used to narrow the range of values for a sensitive attribute of a patient's disease.

Caveats 
Because k-anonymization does not include any randomization, attackers can make reliable, unambiguous inferences about data sets that may harm individuals. For example, if the 19-year-old John from Kerala is known to be in the database above, then it can be reliably said that he has either cancer, a heart-related disease, or a viral infection.

K-anonymization is not a good method to anonymize high-dimensional datasets.

It has also been shown that k-anonymity can skew the results of a data set if it disproportionately suppresses and generalizes data points with unrepresentative characteristics.  The suppression and generalization algorithms used to k-anonymize datasets can be altered, however, so that they do not have such a skewing effect.

See also
 t-closeness
 l-diversity
 Differential privacy

References

Data anonymization techniques
Privacy